Gocke or Göcke is a German surname.  Notable people with the surname include:

Brent Gocke, American television personality
Justin Gocke (1978–2014), American actor
Wilhelm Göcke (1898–1944), German Nazi SS concentration camp commandant

German-language surnames